Sierra de Toloño is a mountain range of the Sierra de Cantabria, located in the province of Álava in the Basque Country, northern Spain.

From the west, the range rises from the Conchas de Haro where the River Ebro enters the region of La Rioja at 445 metres above sea level, and from there runs east forming the northern border of the Rioja Alavesa, separating the Rioja region from the rest of Álava. Its highest point is Mount Toloño at 1271 metres above sea level in the municipality of Labastida. 

It is noted for its steep rock faces on the southern side, and extensive forests in the north. The range is a landmark visible throughout the region.

Peaks

From west to east:
Peña Las Doce (1252 m): "twelve o'clock peak", the name comes from  the shadow it creates at midday. 
La Tortuga (1255 m): "the tortoise", named for the shape of the rock at its peak.
Peña del Castillo (1262 m): so called because a small castle was once situated here. Access is difficult. 
Toloño (1271 m): some 20 metres further to the east of this peak is the border with the province of La Rioja. 
Peña del León (1206 m): part of La Rioja
Azkorri or Colorada (1218 m)

Fauna
The mountain range, together with the Obarenes Mountains, form an EU special protection area for birds of prey. Resident species in these mountains include the golden eagle, peregrine falcon, Griffon vulture, Egyptian vulture, Eurasian eagle-owl, Bonelli's eagle, red kite and common kestrel.

Other larger mammals such as the roe deer, red fox and wild boar can occasionally be seen. At least 68 species of flowering plants have been identified.

Monastery of Santa María del Toloño
The ruins of the Monastery of Santa María de Toloño are located in a meadow at 1201 metres above sea level. It was abandoned in 1422.

References

Tolono
Geography of Álava